Middop is a civil parish in Ribble Valley, Lancashire, England.  It contains four listed buildings that are recorded in the National Heritage List for England.  All of the listed buildings are designated at Grade II, the lowest of the three grades, which is applied to "buildings of national importance and special interest".  The parish is entirely rural, and the listed buildings consist of two houses, one with an attached farm building, a milestone, and a boundary stone.

Buildings

References

Citations

Sources

Lists of listed buildings in Lancashire
Buildings and structures in Ribble Valley